Li Siyuan (born 6 February 1986) is a Chongqing, Chinese footballer who currently plays for Shenzhen Ledman in the China League Two.

Club career
Li Siyuan started his professional football career in 2005 when he joined Chongqing Lifan for the 2005 Chinese Super League campaign.  On 3 July 2005, he made his debut for Chongqing Lifan in the 2005 Chinese Super League against Sichuan Guancheng. 
In March 2011, Li transferred to China League Two side Chongqing F.C.
In March 2014, he transferred to China League Two side Sichuan Longfor.
In July 2014, Li transferred to another China League Two side Meizhou Kejia.

On 23 January 2017, Li moved to League Two side Shenzhen Ledman.

Career statistics 
Statistics accurate as of match played 13 October 2018.

References

1986 births
Living people
Chinese footballers
Footballers from Chongqing
Chongqing Liangjiang Athletic F.C. players
Meizhou Hakka F.C. players
Chinese Super League players
China League One players
Association football defenders